If I Never Stop Loving You is the second and final studio album by American country music artist David Kersh. Its title track was a Top 5 hit on the country music charts in 1998; "Wonderful Tonight" (a cover of Eric Clapton's single) and "Something to Think About" were also released as singles. Also covered here is Faron Young's 1961 hit "Hello Walls".

"I Breathe In, I Breathe Out" was co-written by Chris Cagle, who had not yet begun his own major-label recording career. Although Kersh's version was not released as a single, Cagle would later cut the song for his 2001 album Play It Loud.

Track listing

Personnel
Eddie Bayers - drums, percussion, Hammond B3 organ
Bruce Bouton - steel guitar
Dennis Burnside - piano, organ, keyboards
John Carroll - electric guitar solo on "Hello Walls" and "The Faster I Go"
Mark Casstevens - acoustic guitar
J.T. Corenflos - electric guitar
Thom Flora - background vocals
Larry Franklin - fiddle
Paul Franklin - steel guitar, Pedabro
Wes Hightower - background vocals
Stephen Hinson - steel guitar
John Hughey - steel guitar
Bill Hullett - acoustic guitar
Brent Mason - electric guitar
Michael Rhodes - bass guitar
Matt Rollings - piano on "It's Out of My Hands"
Michael Stevens - electric guitar
Glenn Worf - bass guitar
Curtis Young - background vocals

Charts

Weekly charts

Year-end charts

References

1998 albums
David Kersh albums
Curb Records albums